Jeanette Christina Dousdebes Rubio (born December 5, 1973) is an American former cheerleader, who is married to United States Senator and 2016 presidential candidate Marco Rubio.

Early life 
Jeanette was born in Florida, to parents who had emigrated from Colombia. When she was six, her parents divorced.  Jeanette was raised Roman Catholic and attended South Miami High School.  She met her future husband, Marco Rubio, at a neighborhood party when she was 17 and he was 19. After graduating from high school, she attended Miami Dade College.

Before her marriage, she worked as a bank teller. In 1997, she became a member of the Miami Dolphins Cheerleaders. Her sister, Adriana Dousdebes, was also a cheerleader for the Dolphins. Jeanette was featured in the Miami Dolphins Cheerleaders' first swimsuit calendar. It was during her time as a cheerleader that Jeanette Dousdebes and Marco Rubio, who were only slightly acquainted in high school, met again and began to date.

When the Rubios were first married, she enrolled in a course of study in fashion design at International Fine Arts College, but did not complete her studies, devoting herself, instead, to being a full-time mother of four children. Rubio has told the press that mothering four small children while married to a politician is very much "like being a single mom."

During her husband's service in the Florida legislature, Rubio lived with the children near Miami, traveling to Tallahassee to be with her husband as often as she could.

Political involvement  

During the race for speaker, she was enlisted by her husband to manage the political action committees he used to support his travel and consultants, a decision he later described as a "disaster" as it resulted in confusion on financial transactions related to travel and expenses, due to "inexperience, sloppiness and a blur of paperwork" according to a report by the Tampa Bay Times.

Unlike many spouses of presidential candidates, Rubio did not make campaign speeches.

Rubio's campaign spotlighted her career as a Dolphins cheerleader in a television ad broadcast shortly before the Iowa caucuses, the New Hampshire primary, and the NFL playoffs.

The Washington Post reported that Rubio is a part-time employee of the Norman Braman Family 2011 Charitable Foundation, which is also a financial backer of her husband Marco Rubio, and likely to commit as much as 10 million to pro-Rubio PACs.

Charitable work
Rubio volunteers for an organization called Kristi's House, which serves youth in the Miami area who have been abused or involved in human trafficking.

Personal life 

The Rubios live in West Miami, Florida, close to Jeanette's three sisters.

The Rubios had a Catholic wedding in 1998 at the Church of the Little Flower in Coral Gables, Florida and have four children: Daniella, Amanda, Dominick, and Anthony.

Rubio and her family regularly attend both Roman Catholic Mass at Church of the Little Flower and Protestant worship services at Christ Fellowship, an Evangelical megachurch aligned with the Southern Baptist Convention. She hosts a weekly Bible study class in her home.  Her three younger children attend a private Protestant Christian school while the eldest attends a Catholic high school.

References

External links

1973 births
Living people
American cheerleaders
American female dancers
Dancers from Florida
American people of Colombian descent
American Roman Catholics
Florida Republicans
Marco Rubio
Miami Dade College alumni
Miami Dolphins personnel
National Football League cheerleaders
Spouses of Florida politicians
Latino conservatism in the United States